A raygun is a science-fiction directed-energy weapon that releases energy, usually with destructive effect. They have various alternate names: ray gun, death ray, beam gun, blaster, laser gun, laser pistol, phaser, zap gun, etc. In most stories, when activated, a raygun emits a ray, typically visible, usually lethal if it hits a human target, often destructive if it hits mechanical objects, with properties and other effects unspecified or varying.

Real-world analogues are directed-energy weapons or electrolasers: electroshock weapons which send current along an electrically conductive laser-induced plasma channel.

History
A very early example of a raygun is the Heat-Ray featured in H. G. Wells' novel The War of the Worlds (1898). Science fiction during the 1920s described death rays. Early science fiction often described or depicted raygun beams making bright light and loud noise like lightning or large electric arcs.

According to The Encyclopedia of Science Fiction, the word "ray gun" was first used by Victor Rousseau in 1917, in a passage from The Messiah of the Cylinder:
All is not going well, Arnold: the ray-rods are emptying fast, and our attack upon the lower level of the wing has failed. Sanson has placed a ray-gun there. All depends on the air-scouts, and we must hold our positions until the battle-planes arrive.

The variant "ray projector" was used by John W. Campbell in The Black Star Passes in 1930. Related terms "disintegrator ray" dates to 1898 in Garrett P. Serviss' Edison's Conquest of Mars; "blaster" dates to 1925 in Nictzin Dyalhis' story "When the Green Star Waned"; and "needle ray" and "needler" date to 1934 in E. E. Smith's The Skylark of Valeron.

Ray guns were so common on magazine covers during the Golden Age of Science Fiction that Campbell's Astounding was unusual for not depicting them. The term "ray gun" had already become cliché by the 1940s, in part due to association with the comic strips (and later film serials) Buck Rogers and Flash Gordon.
Soon after the invention of lasers during 1960, such devices became briefly fashionable as a directed-energy weapon for science fiction stories. For instance, characters of the Lost in Space TV series (1965–1968) and of the Star Trek pilot episode "The Cage" (1964) carried handheld laser weapons.

By the late 1960s and 1970s, as the laser's limits as a weapon became evident, rayguns were dubbed "phasers" (for Star Trek), "blasters" (Star Wars), "pulse rifles", "plasma rifles", and so forth.

In his book Physics of the Impossible, Michio Kaku used gamma ray bursts as an evidence to illustrate that extremely powerful rayguns such as the Death Star's primary weapon in the Star Wars franchise do not violate known physical laws and theories. He further analyses the problem of rayguns' power sources.

Function
Ray guns as described by science fiction do not have the disadvantages that have, so far, made directed-energy weapons largely impractical as weapons in real life, needing a suspension of disbelief by a technologically educated audience:
Ray guns draw seemingly limitless power from often unspecified sources. In contrast to their real-world counterparts, the batteries or power packs of even handheld weapons are minute, durable, and do not seem to need frequent recharging.
Ray guns in movies are often shown as shooting discrete pulses of energy visible from off-axis, traveling slowly enough for people to see them emerge, or even for the target to evade them, although real-life laser light is invisible from off-axis and travels at the speed of light. This effect could sometimes be attributed to the beam heating atmosphere that it was passing through. A possible evasion tactic is dodging the firing axis of the gun, theorized in the early story of Mobile Suit Gundam by the character Char Aznable when he first encountered the series protagonist's machine's beam rifle and seemingly dodging it without any difficulty.

Some of the effects are what would be expected from a powerful directed-energy beam if it could be generated in reality:
Ray guns are often shown as transmitting heat, as with Wells' heat rays.
Ray guns may be used to cut through hard materials like a blowtorch.

But sometimes not:
In movies, rays are often depicted as having effect instantaneously, with a touch of the beam sufficing for the intended purpose. Raygun victims are generally killed instantaneously, often – as in the Star Wars films – without showing visible wounds or even holes in their clothing.
Some rayguns cause their targets to disappear ("de-materialize", disintegrate, vaporize or evaporate) entirely, personal equipment and all.
Visible barrel recoil. This would only happen if the momentum of the beam were comparable to that of a bullet shot from a gun.
A wide range of non-lethal functions as determined by the requirements of the story: for instance, they may stun, paralyze or knock down a target, much like modern electroshock weapons. Occasionally the rays may have other effects, such as the "freeze rays" in the TV series Batman (1966–1968) and Underdog (1964–1970). Many of the more implausible functions are almost farcical and include rayguns that age or de-age people (various cartoons); shrink rays (Fantastic Voyage, Honey, I Shrunk the Kids), and a "dehydration ray" (Megamind).

Ultimately, rayguns have whatever properties are required for their dramatic purpose. They bear little resemblance to real-world directed-energy weapons, even if they are given the names of existing technologies such as lasers, masers, or particle beams. This can be compared with real-type firearms as commonly depicted by action movies, as tending infallibly to hit whatever they are aimed at (when wielded by the heroes) and seldom depleting their ammunition.

Rayguns by their various names have various sizes and forms: pistol-like; two-handed (often called a rifle); mounted on a vehicle; artillery-sized mounted on a spaceship or space base or asteroid or planet.

Rayguns have a great variety of shapes and sizes, according to the imagination of the story writers or movie prop makers. Most pistol rayguns have a conventional grip and trigger but some (e.g. Star Trek: The Next Generation phasers) do not. Sometimes the end of the barrel expands into a shield, as if to protect the user from back-flash from the emitted beam.

Types

The "rays" the guns use vary. They are sometimes equated to real life technologies such as:
 lasers
 particle beams, e.g. protons and/or neutrons from the proton packs in Ghostbusters
 plasma, e.g. plasma rifles, Star Wars "Blasters"

Alternately, the weapon mechanics can be purely fictional. Fictional ray types include:
"Minovsky particles" in the Gundam anime series
 "Rapid Nadion particles" utilized by the phasers in Star Trek

List of rayguns

The following is a list of notable rayguns.

Literature

 Heat-Ray, weapons used by the Martians in the novel The War of the Worlds by H. G. Wells
 The Garin Death Ray, title weapon in The Hyperboloid of Engineer Garin (1927): "hyperboloid", a highly concentrated collimated light beam weapon
 Lasgun, a laser projector from the Dune series of books

Film and television

 Proton pack, an energy weapon used for weakening ghosts and aiding in capturing them in the film Ghostbusters
 Phasers, disruptors, and plasma cannons are a few of the many weapons of Star Trek
 Blasters, standard weapons of the Star Wars universe.

Games

 BFG, a large gun in the Doom and Quake series of games

See also

 Weapons in science fiction

References

External links
Atomic Rocket: descriptions and technology and many images of handguns and rifle-sized guns used in space including rayguns.
The Virtual Ray Gun Exhibition: Computer-generated ray gun art by various artists.

Fictional energy weapons